Tocileni may refer to:

Tocileni, a village in Stăuceni Commune, Botoşani County
Tocileni, a village in Pârscov Commune, Buzău County